Disney Channel was a pan-Asian pay television kids channel owned and operated by The Walt Disney Company Southeast Asia; part of The Walt Disney Company Asia-Pacific.

It began broadcasting in Taiwan on 29 March 1995, until its main launch on January 2000, when it first broadcast in Malaysia, Singapore, Brunei, and the Philippines. It later expanded to most Southeast Asian countries in the months following. The channel was closed on 1 October 2021, while Taiwan's branch ended on 1 January 2022, as part of a wider switch to streaming services Disney+ and Disney+ Hotstar.

Disney Channel Asia's programming consists of original first-run television series, theatrically released and original made-for-cable movies and select other third-party programming, including Upin & Ipin, BoBoiBoy, Boboiboy Galaxy, Ejen Ali, Harry & Bunnie, and Chuck Chicken, all of which originate from Malaysia; and Just for Laughs Gags Asia, a Singaporean version of Just for Laughs Gags. It also features original adaptations from Singapore and Malaysia, such as Studio Disney (first known as Disney Buzz), Waktu Rehat & As the Bell Rings Singapore (both based on Disney Channel Italy's Quelli dell'intervallo); Art Attack Asia (based on the British series), Club Mickey Mouse (based on The Mickey Mouse Club), Wizards of Warna Walk (based on Wizards of Waverly Place), and Mickey Go Local.

History

Disney Channel began broadcasting in Taiwan on 29 March 1995 at 2:00 pm (Taipei), marking its first Disney Channel overseas. The ceremony took place at Grand Hyatt Taipei in Taiwan.

And after Australia's launch back on 8 June 1996, on January 2000, Disney Television International Asia-Pacific officially launches Disney Channel and was made available for Malaysia, Singapore, Brunei and the Philippines; broadcasting with an English audio track with Mandarin subtitles. 

The channel was exclusively on Astro in Malaysia, including Kristal-Astro in Brunei (now defunct); Singapore Cable Vision (SCV) in Singapore (now StarHub TV); and Home Cable (later defunct), Asian Cable Communications (ACCION), and Dream Satellite TV (later defunct) in the Philippines; it also appeared in some local providers.

During the launch, the channel was featured the premiered movies, The Lion King II: Simba's Pride, Sleeping Beauty, Mary Poppins, Hercules, George of the Jungle, The Parent Trap and the live action version of 101 Dalmatians, including the series The Wonderful World of Disney. It was also features American television series Hercules The Series, Timon and Pumbaa, Bear in the Big Blue House, and The New Adventures of Winnie the Pooh, with the dramatic kid series Crash Zone and Flash Forward. And also includes its original series, Disney Buzz, a.k.a. Studio Disney; and its morning block Playhouse Disney.

On 1 June 2002, the channel was launched in the South Korean market, with additional Korean subtitles under English language. And on July 2002, Disney Channel expands to Indonesia, which is first exclusively on cable via Kabelvision (now First Media) and on satellite via Indovision Digital (now MNC Vision). It still broadcast in English language, but planned for Indonesian dubbing a few months later.

On December 2002, Disney Channel Asia moved its headquarters to Singapore, which where it first launch its satellite broadcasting center back in 1995.

On 2 April 2004, Disney Channel along with Playhouse Disney launched in Hong Kong. It was also launch Playhouse Disney in Indonesia as well.

Over the first six months of 2005, Disney Channel Asia, along with sister channel Playhouse Disney (now Disney Junior) was launched in Vietnam, Palau and Thailand. It finished off with a launch of both in Cambodia, its 11th market on 20 June 2005, with Cambodia Entertainment Production Co. Ltd. as distributor. It later launches Playhouse Disney in some markets since 2004 in the Philippines, Singapore, Malaysia, Brunei, and South Korea.

On December 2006, Disney Channel expanded to Papua New Guinea.

On 1 July 2011, Disney Channel launches its Korean feed separating the pan-Asian feed, which is the first Disney channel to be broadcasting for Korean dubbing. And on 11 July 2011, Its sister channel Playhouse Disney relaunched as Disney Junior, coinciding the premiere of Jake and the Neverland Pirates.

On 15 September 2012, Disney Channel's third sister channel Disney XD launches in Malaysia. It was later launched in Singapore on 16 March 2013, Indonesia and Thailand on 19 October 2013, and concluding in the Philippines on 31 May 2014.

On 1 June 2013 in Singapore, three Disney channels were expanded on Singtel's IPTV service Mio TV (now Singtel TV).

After the ban of Disney Channel India and Disney XD India in Bangladesh as the networks were constantly broadcasting content in the Hindi language and its heavy localization back in 2013, Disney Channel Asia was made available on several digital cable platforms, such as Bengal Digital, in the country in approximately 2016. Due to the closure of the channel, India-based Disney International HD started broadcasting in Bangladesh as a replacement.

On 25 May 2018, Disney launched DisneyLife in the Philippines, a similar version of Disney+ originally launched in the United Kingdom back in 2015. It 'downgraded' streaming service was later discontinued its operations on 1 April 2020.

On 1 September 2020, Disney Channel in Indonesia was separated from the main feed, following of the launch of Disney+ Hotstar on 5 September 2020. It also has a live stream on the website, and airs some idents as well.

Closure 
Disney Channel, Disney XD and Disney Junior ceased transmissions in Singapore on 1 June 2020 after failing to renew their contracts, on both Singtel and StarHub. Its content was moved to and replaced with Disney+, since it was launched in the country on 23 February 2021.

On 1 January 2021, Disney Channel and Disney Junior ceased transmission in Malaysia on Astro due to the TV provider's Refreshed Kids Pack, and the preparation of the launch of Disney+ Hotstar in the country. It ceases transmission while airing Bolt at midnight. Disney's content was moved to the streaming service, since its launch on 1 June 2021. Also on 1 January that year due to the review of Disney's business in the region, (particularly Singapore), its sister channel Disney XD was closed in the said region, after Malaysia's end of transmission of their channels.

After 21 years on the air, Disney Channel, including Disney Junior and most of its Fox channels officially closed in the rest of Asia; and Hong Kong on 1 October 2021. Before the closure, it released back on 4 September 2021, an "image spot" promo showed that the channel will be ended; created and produced by Red Dot Moving Pictures in Singapore. It ceases its operations at midnight (JKT/THAI), concluding with Star vs. the Forces of Evil (Southeast Asia) and Bao (Hong Kong). While the Indonesian and Vietnam feeds cease earlier.

After the closure, Disney Channel in Taiwan will continue to operate, until its cessation on New Year's Day (1 January 2022), concluding with a Big Hero 6 short also at midnight (In Taipei's Time). While most of its content (including third-party programs) will be replaced on Disney+ and Disney+ Hotstar depends on their countries' versions.

Presentation and logos
With the launch of the channel in 2000, Disney Channel Asia began to use the "Circles" presentation package, until the end of April 2003, when the US logo (and design package by CA Square) as the "Bounce" graphics, it became the channel's on-air presentation format, then later rebranded using the "Ribbon" graphics from 2007 until 2011. Two more redesigns were made in 2012, then on 1 August 2014, with the current wordmark logo.

Disney Channel Asia started using parts of the US "Social Media" rebrand from 1 December 2017 and rebranded fully on 1 January 2018 at 6 am. As of 2020, it has also used elements of the US "Item Age" graphics, while Hong Kong & Taiwan keep its old branding before the closure.

Final feeds

Southeast Asia
The pan-Asian feed was available in Thailand, Palau, Cambodia, Papua New Guinea, Myanmar, and Bangladesh. This feed stopped airing movies and started sharing the same schedule with the Indonesian feed on 1 February 2021. This feed officially ceased all operations on 1 October 2021.

Singapore
The schedule was similar to the main feed, plus local advertisements. Some programming was replaced by sitcoms. This feed was ceased operations on 1 June 2020, after failing to renew their contracts on both StarHub & Singtel; due to the launch of Disney+ on 23 February 2021.

Malaysia and Brunei
Same schedule as the Asia feed, plus local advertisements; began early on January 15, 2000. It was available in four languages: English, Malay, Mandarin and Tamil. This channel was only available on Astro in Malaysia and Kristal-Astro in Brunei. Because of Astro's Refreshed Kids Pack on 14 December 2020 and the arrival of Disney+ Hotstar, Disney Channel, along with Disney Junior, they will not be available on Astro and Astro-owned TV providers (including NJOI and Kristal-Astro).

Therefore, there's the only impact that The Walt Disney Company will be shutting down Disney XD in Southeast Asia on the same date and time by following the review of Disney's business in this region, just before Astro has already confirmed with this statement before Astro shutting down both Disney Channel and Disney Junior on the same date and time. However, The Walt Disney Company didn't announce that Astro will be shutting down Disney Channel and Disney Junior on New Year's Day 2021 at midnight. This feed ceased operations on 1 January 2021, along with Disney Junior and Disney XD, on Astro due to the TV provider's Refreshed Kids Pack and the launch of Disney+ Hotstar on 1 June 2021.

Indonesia
Began in July 2002; the schedule was very similar to the main feed, with the exclusions of movies at launch. It was separated from the main feed from 1 September 2020, during the launch of Disney+ Hotstar on 5 September 2020.

This feed later started sharing the same schedule with the main feed on 1 February 2021. There are also Disney+ Hotstar idents on this feed. The channel completely closed on October 1, 2021, leaving the streaming platform behind.

Philippines
Began on January 15, 2000. It had the same schedule as the Asia feed, plus local advertisements. The channel ceased operations on 1 October 2021, with Disney+ made available lately since 17 November 2022.

Vietnam
Expanded in May 2005. A one-hour time-shifted version of the main Asia feed with local advertisements, Vietnamese translations in promos, and subtitles. The channel ceased operations on 1 October 2021.

Hong Kong
Launched last 2 April 2004, along with Playhouse Disney. The schedule of this feed was shared with the Taiwan feed and was separated from the main feed on 2 April 2004. It was broadcast in English and Cantonese languages. The channel ceased operations on 1 October 2021, due to the launch of Disney+ on 16 November 2021.

Taiwan
It was the first overseas feed launched by Disney Channels Worldwide. It began operations on 29 March 1995. It had its own schedule with local advertisements and broadcasts in English and Taiwanese Mandarin. The feed ceased operations on 1 January 2022, after 26 years of broadcasting, due to the launch of Disney+ on 12 November 2021.

HD channel
On 2 May 2015, The Walt Disney Company Southeast Asia launched a high-definition simulcast feed of Disney Channel in the Philippines, available on Sky Cable and Destiny Cable distributed by ACCION in that country. Just like its SD counterpart, the HD simulcast of the channel airs the same shows shown in the SD feed. The HD feed was also launched on TrueVisions in Thailand on 7 July 2016 as an exclusive for cable subscribers, and on Astro in Malaysia on 15 November 2019 for satellite subscribers. The HD channels also ceased transmission on 1 October 2021.

Sister channels (closed)

Disney Junior 

It was a 24-hour Southeast Asian television preschool channel, and the sister channel of Disney Channel, amid at kids and preschoolers two to seven (2-7) years old. Originally launched as a morning block on Disney Channel as Playhouse Disney in 2000; and officially launches as a television channel on 2 April 2004 in Hong Kong and Indonesia. It was later expanded in Singapore, Malaysia, Brunei, Thailand, Vietnam, Cambodia, and the Philippines; between 2004 and 2005 respectively.

On 11 July 2011, Playhouse Disney was rebranded as Disney Junior, on both the morning block and the television channel itself. The block was discontinued on 31 July 2018 due to their business changes, while the channel was entirely closed in the region on 1 October 2021 along with Disney Channel; excluding Singapore and Malaysia, since it previously ceased transmission in those countries on 1 June 2020 and 1 January 2021 respectively.

Disney XD 

It was a Southeast Asian television channel, amid for big kids and teenagers six to fifteen (6-15) years old, the channels launch on 15 September 2012 in Malaysia, 16 March 2013 in Singapore, 19 October 2013, in Indonesia and Thailand; and 31 May 2014 in the Philippines, concluding its launch. The channels was closed on 1 January 2021, excluding Singapore, since it was took out back on 1 June 2020.

Programming

Final programming 
Note: programs labelled in bold occurred Disney Channel originals.

 Amphibia
 Beyblade Burst Surge
 Big City Greens
 Big Hero 6: The Series
 Bunk'd
 Cupcake & Dino: General Services
 Ducktales
 Gravity Falls
 Miraculous: Tales of Ladybug & Cat Noir
 Pokémon the Series: Sun & Moon – Ultra Legends
 Oswaldo
 Phineas and Ferb
 Rabbids Invasion
 Star vs. the Forces of Evil 
 Supa Strikas
 Upin & Ipin

Programming Blocks

Final

Movies Unlimited 
It was the final programming block on Disney Channel. Aires at 3:00pm PH time (2:00pm JKT/BKK time), airing random movies; it was finished on 30 September 2021, prior to the closure.

Former

Monstober 
It was a halloween programming block with special marathons. It was concluded on October 2020.

Disney Junior 
It was the preschool morning block of Disney Channel, began during the 2000 launch as Playhouse Disney. Rebranded as Disney Junior on Disney Channel on 11 July 2011 and was discontinued on 31 July 2018.

Original series and adaptations

Studio Disney

As the Bell Rings Singapore

Waktu Rehat

Harry & Bunnie (distribution)

Club Mickey Mouse 
Club Mickey Mouse was the Malaysian adaptation of Mickey Mouse Club, originally premiere on 15 September 2017.

Wizards of Warna Walk

Events 
Prior to the COVID-19 Pandemic and the channels' closure, Disney bought these events as shown.

Before the grand opening of Hong Kong Disneyland on 12 September 2005, Disney Channel released an audition for "Disney Channel's on Assignment: Hong Kong DisneyLand", as several kids auditioned and assigned as there hosts. Its winners, include Filipina star Nadine Lustre, Brian Choo from South Korea, Siti Nasuha Bte. Ramlee from Singapore, Suraj Bulchand from Malaysia, and Elaine Ding from Hong Kong as its reporters. It showed a delayed and taped opening on 24 September at 7:30 pm local time.

Between 21 and 22 July 2018, Disney Channel Asia opened Big Hero 6 Power Up Carnival held at the Mid Valley Megamall in Kuala Lumpur, Malaysia.

From 13-22 September, 27 September-6 October, 11-20 October, and 1-10 November 2019, The Walt Disney Company Philippines and Vista Malls opened Disney Channel Live at Vista Mall, happened at Evia Lifestyle Center in Las Piñas, Metro Manila; Vista Mall Taguig, Vista Mall Sta. Rosa, Laguna, and Vista Mall Bataan in Balanga respectively, featuring with the themes and games from the shows, Ducktales, Rapunzel's Tangled Adventure, and Big Hero 6: The Series; but rarely features a special meet and greet with Baymax on 20 to 22 September at Evia Lifestyle Center itself. Similar to the version, that Disney Junior went first from 31 May to 8 July that year.

References 

Southeast Asia
Children's television channels in the Asia Pacific
English-language television stations
Television channels and stations disestablished in 2021
Mass media in Southeast Asia
Television channels and stations established in 2000
Television channel articles with incorrect naming style